Jerry Reed Sings Jim Croce is an album by American country singer Jerry Reed, released by RCA Records in 1980. The album is a tribute album for Jim Croce who died in 1973 in a plane crash during the peak of his career. Seven of the ten songs were singles released by Croce. The album peaked at number 56 on the Billboard country chart. The song "Age" (b/w "Workin' at the Car Wash Blues") was the only single released from the album. It peaked at 36 on the Billboard Hot Country Songs chart.

Critical reception
Billboard reviewer named this work as "fine tribute package". He wrote: "Reed's ebullient vocal style gives a fresh treatment to Croce's originals, many of which are fast-paced humorous numbers like "You Don't Mess Around with Jim" and "Bad, Bad Leroy Brown." Yet when the need arises for quieter vocals carrying more depth and feeling, Reed adapts his style to fit the mood, as evidenced on ballads such as "Time in a Bottle" and "Age." Reed adds his inimitable guitar touches throughout".

Track listing

Chart performance

Personnel
Jerry Reed - guitar, vocals
Kenny Penny - guitar
Stan Dacus - engineer
Wayne 'The Professor' Harrison - keyboards
 Paul Cooke - drums

References

1980 albums
Jerry Reed albums
RCA Records albums
Jim Croce tribute albums